Events in the year 1873 in Norway.

Incumbents
Monarch: Oscar II

Events
 The office of Governor-general of Norway is abolished.

Arts and literature

Births
5 March – Olav Bjaaland, ski champion and polar explorer (died 1961)
9 March – Yngvar Sonnichsen,  Norwegian-American artist and painter (died 1938)
11 March – Arnold Holmboe, politician and Minister (died 1956)
3 May – Nini Roll Anker, novelist and playwright (died 1942)
23 May – Ragnhild Kåta, first deafblind person in Norway to receive proper schooling (died 1947)
26 May – Olaf Gulbransson, artist, painter and designer (died 1958)
7 July – Halvdan Koht, historian, biographer, politician and Minister (died 1965)
22 July – Martinus Lørdahl, businessperson, multi sports competitor and sports administrator (died 1933).
11 September – Hanna Resvoll-Holmsen, botanist (died 1943)
10 October – Johan Martin Jakobsen Strand, farmer and politician (died 1935)
16 October – Einar Liberg, rifle shooter and Olympic gold medallist (died 1955)

Full date unknown
Axel Aubert, businessperson (died 1943)
Paal Olav Berg, politician and Minister (died 1968)
Gerdt Henrik Meyer Bruun, politician and Minister (died 1945)
Rasmus Olsen Langeland, politician and Minister (died 1954)
Haagen Krog Steffens, historian, archivist and genealogist (died 1917)

Deaths
11 April – Christopher Hansteen, astronomer and physicist (born 1784)
5 June – Peder Carl Lasson, jurist and politician (born 1798)
16 October – Frederik Due, politician (born 1796)
21 October – Johan Sebastian Welhaven, poet and critic (born 1807)

Full date unknown
Christian Ludvig Diriks, politician and Minister (born 1802)
Ole Larsen Hammerstad, politician (born 1817)

See also

References